The University of Toronto Mississauga is a satellite campus of the University of Toronto. It is in Mississauga, Ontario, Canada about 33 kilometres west of the main St. George campus. It was formerly called the Erindale College but was later changed to the University of Toronto Mississauga (UTM). The campus has eight main educational buildings: the  Maanjiwe nendamowinan Building (built in 2019), Deerfield Hall, the William G. Davis Building (formerly known as the South Building), the Kaneff Centre and Blackwood Gallery, the Recreation, Athletic, and Wellness Centre, the Hazel McCallion Academic Learning Centre which holds UTM's library, the Instructional Building, and the new Terrence Donnelly Health Sciences Complex for the Mississauga Academy of Medicine. The campus also houses 3 residence halls: Erindale Hall, Roy Ivor Hall, and Oscar Peterson Hall.

North Building

The North Building was the original educational building for UTM, formerly known as Erindale College. Construction for the North Building began in 1966. It was originally intended to be temporary and to be used for administrative purposes such as the registrar's office. Classes in the building began for the 1967 school year, with 155 students, 28 faculty, and 40 staff. Since then numerous additions and remodels have been made to the building. Today the only part of the original structure that remains is the cafeteria and some classrooms of the first floor. The building is now home to the Department of Humanities. Room capacities range from 48-person classrooms to a 200-person lecture hall and the cafe contains Coyote Jacks, Pita Pit, Tim Hortons and Mr. Sub vendors. The North Building was demolished in 2015 and the New North building (which was later renamed to Maanjiwe nednamowinan) was opened in 2018.

William G. Davis Building (South Building)

The University of Toronto Mississauga (UTM) is situated by the west bank of the Credit River. This made it an idyllic location to start constructing what architect Raymond Moriyama called the "UTM Campus Master Plan" in 1967. That year, the North Building was created as a temporary academic facility which marked the beginning of Erindale College. As this building was only meant to serve as a temporary shelter, Moriyama originally thought that there would be one central building that would hold all academic facilities, thus preserving the natural state of the campus. The idea of creating this "mega-structure" led to the development of the South Building. It was then constructed, and in 1973, the South Building was opened on the UTM campus. Since then however, the South Building has undergone major reconstruction. It now offers numerous essential services to students including the bookstore, Campus Police, and the Career Centre. Named for the late William G. Davis, an alumnus and former Ontario premier, building will continue to represent his title, legacy, and influential role in founding UTM.

UTM has experienced "a period of rapid growth with an enrolment increase of approximately 71%." With such a significant increase in the population, the campus had to naturally meet the demands of this growth. Five buildings have been constructed from 2000 to 2007 in order to support this growth, one of which have been an extension onto the South Building: the Recreation, Athletics and Wellness Centre. Another major building that was constructed in 2006, to facilitate such change was the Hazel McCallion Academic Learning Centre (HMALC) which now functions as a library. Prior to this, the second and third floor of the South Building were used as the campus's library. With the creation of the HMALC, 5,800 square meters became free to expand the building further. A "phased approach" was taken for the renovations as this allowed them to tackle the re-allocation and construction of the South Building sequentially.  According to Kearns Mancini Architect inc., the firm that took on the first phase of renovations for South Building, the project was valued at $6 million. They renovated 32,000 square meters of the building, and completed it in 2009.

Kearns Mancini converted the library into a space for extra classrooms, faculty, and administrative offices. Both Departments of Sociology and Geography, campus police services, and offices for executive faculty have been allocated to this section. The architects renovated with the goal of achieving a LEED Gold rating. This led them to put environmental sustainability at the forefront of their architectural design. The renovated portion of the South Building exploits natural light as a way to further the model of environmental sustainability. There are domed skylights to increase the amount of sunlight in the building as well as clerestory skylights which are designed to trap in heat for the winter, and keep heat out for the summer. These environmental innovations are a reflection of UTM's "Grow Smart, Grow Green" mentality.

Kaneff Centre

The Kaneff Centre, named after Bulgarian-born Canadian businessman, construction magnate and philanthropist Ignat Kaneff, was constructed in 1992 to house the political science, economics, commerce and management programs. Its lecture halls range from 53 persons-limit halls to the campuses second largest lecture theatre courtesy of additional philanthropy from the Matthews Family.  Matthews Auditorium seats up to 352 students. In 2010, the political science department moved to the William Davis Building.

Blackwood Gallery
The Kaneff Centre also holds UTM's own art gallery: the Blackwood Gallery. Its main space is within the Kaneff Centre but additional gallery space can be found in the e|gallery, on the ground floor of the CCT building. The Blackwood Gallery is also in charge of the Bernie Miller Lightbox outside the South Building, also known as William G. Davis Building. Back in 1967, the campus’ first gallery was a small corridor in the Temporary Building, which is now known as Maanjiwe Nendamowinan.  The Blackwood Gallery curates the work of local, national, and international professional artists. Every year the Blackwood Gallery will hold approximately five exhibitions, consisting of on-site and off-site exhibitions, and graduating student shows.  Other than exhibitions and shows, the Blackwood Gallery also presents publications, public lectures, symposia, and conferences. During the summer months, the Blackwood Gallery holds a contemporary arts summer day camp for children ages 5–12. The summer camp is named “Running With Scissors.”

Innovation Complex 

The Innovation complex was opened in September 2014 as an expansion to the Kaneff Centre. The expansion provided 6,300 square metres (67, 800 sq ft) of additional space and placed a large rotunda in the middle of the Kaneff Centre. The expansion cost $35 million, $10 million of which came from a grant from the city of Mississauga. The Innovation Complex is certified as LEED Silver.

Erindale Hall 
Erindale Hall is a residence hall that was completed in August 2003 on a budget of $11.5 million. The hall is located centrally along the 5 minute walk, between Deerfield Hall and the Student Centre. Currently, the hall is set up in apartment style housing, with suites of 4 rooms, each housing two people. During the construction of Maanjiwe nendamowinan the second and third floors of the residence hall were used as office space and housed the Departments of English & Drama, Language Studies, and Historical Studies.

Recreation, Athletic, and Wellness Centre (RAWC)
The Recreation Athletic  and Wellness Centre (RAWC) is a membership university-based facility.  The facility is at the University of Toronto Mississauga campus, which is positioned at 3359 Mississauga Rd. North in Mississauga Ontario. The RAWC opened up in September 2006. The facility is 73,000 square feet.  The facility offers a variety of activities and advancements from the previous used space, such as: a 25-metre lane, 8-lane pool, 12 person hot pool, double gymnasium with seating for 880 spectators/fans, new fitness centre, new studio, indoor running track and a sports medicine clinic.

In March 2021, the RAWC began serving as a COVID-19 mass vaccination clinic. The clinic was run by Trillium Health Partners and delivered more than 335,000 vaccine doses during the five months it was repurposed as a clinic. The location on UTM campus proved valuable because the university was able to supply specialized freezers, ones that are usually used for scientific research, to safely store the vaccines. The large open space of the gym and the RAWC's location was easy to reach by both public transit and car. Free parking in two nearby lots were made available for those associated with the clinic.

Communication, Culture and Technology Building (CCT)

The Communication, Culture and Technology (CCT) building is one of the new buildings at the University of Toronto, Mississauga. It is near the center of the campus between the Student Centre and the McCallion Academic learning Centre and Library. The building covers up to 10, 800 square meters or 1123,819 square feet of space. The exterior walls are mainly constructed out of glass making the outside visible from the inside. The architectural design of the interior is meant to reflect the contemporary studies that the CCT building was made to house.  The offices and classrooms are mostly facing the park or the courtyard garden 

The building is used by the University of Toronto and Sheridan College as they have joint programs together. The main academic programs that use the CCT building are: Communication, Culture and Information Technology (CCIT), Professional Writing and Communication (PWC), the Centre for Visual and Media Culture (CVMC), Biomedical Communications (BMC) and Digital Enterprise Management (DEM).  Inside of the CCT building there is research and support space as well as lecture halls. There are also classrooms, laboratories, undergraduate teaching as well as academic and administrative offices and student services available inside.  CCT is also home to the Multimedia Studio Theatre or MiST and The E-Gallery.

The building cost 35 million dollars and was funded by City of Mississauga, Canada Foundation for Innovation, Government of Ontario, Ontario Innovation Trust, University Infrastructure Investment Fund, Access to Opportunities Programs and U of T Enrolment Growth Funds. It also received private support from GE Canada, Hitachi Canada, and The Mississauga Board of Chinese Professionals and Businesses (CPB).

The CCT building was designed by Saucier + Perrotte architects, structurally engineered by Quinn Dressel and Mechanically and electrically engineered by Rybka, Smith and Ginsler. The project began in 2004. In 2008 it was awarded a Governor General's Medal in Architecture.

Hazel McCallion Academic Learning Centre (UTM Library)

The Hazel McCallion Academic Learning Centre is in the University of Toronto Mississauga.  In other words, it is called the library and functions as a study space.  The construction for the new library began on November 3, 2004.  It was "topped off" in August 2005. The opening date for the Hazel McCallion Academic Learning Centre was in October, 2006.  The library's dimensions are 10,075 gross square metres/ (per) 108,500 square feet. Study rooms are located on each floor and can be booked through the library website.  The companies and organizations that have funded this particular projects are: Government of Ontario, U of T Enrolment Growth Fund, and Student Library Enhancement Fund. Multiple other companies have contributed and supported this project, such as: RBC Financial Group, Biovail Corporation International, and Rotary Clubs of Mississauga. The centre is named after former Mississauga Mayor Hazel McCallion. McCallion was named a special advisor to UTM in 2015.

Oscar Peterson Hall (OPH) 
Oscar Peterson Hall was opened in 2007 as a residence hall at the university. Located adjacent to Erindale hall, OPH is a focal point for students living on campus. Student mail distribution occurs at Oscar Peterson Hall, and resident services are located in the hall. OPH is also the location of Coleman Commons, the only traditional style dining hall at the university. All student housing rooms in Oscar Peterson Hall are single bedroom dormitories. The residence is named after famed jazz musician Oscar Peterson, a Mississauga resident who in 2021 was honoured with a Heritage Minute.

Instructional Building (IB)

In response to the doubling of student enrolment over the past decade, the UTM campus building infrastructure has continued to expand to meet growing enrollment needs. The construction of the Instructional Centre, also known as the Instructional Building (IB), had plans drawn out in 2002. The much-innovated construction of the IB building is composed of green patinated copper strips aiming in a vertical direction continuing inside the building, adding to the physical appearance of the facility. The use of the copper panels increases classroom space by 50% and increases the use of green infrastructure by 60%. UTM's Instructional building includes geothermal heating and cooling systems under the nearby football field as well as awnings with thin photovoltaic cells which contribute to shade on the south side of the building. Other renewable energy ideas were also included in the construction of the building such as the inclusion of green roofs and reflective membranes which play a big role in the reduction of urban heat as well as energy and water-efficient lighting and fixtures. The building has been considered as a LEED silver-certified project and will soon be certified as LEED Gold. In addition, the building contains many windows, which enable much light to enter which creates a warm and friendly atmosphere for students.

The construction of the Instructional centre and the new Health and Science complex has led to an enduring loss of 450 parking spaces. However, the project has opened a new window of opportunity for students and staff since it provides and accommodates up to 2,500 students simultaneously. Included in this newly built structure are auditorium or lecture halls containing as many as 500 students respectively. In addition, the structure also offers study rooms meant for more individual study time.  The study rooms are significantly smaller than lecture halls and are able to accommodate 30 students. Also included in this structure is a 24/7 computer lab with an average of 50 computers. Throughout the entire building, the classrooms and lab rooms are equipped with e-connected spaces using newly digital technology which encourages students in their learning process. In addition, this facility includes lounges through its three stories as well as a café (Second cup) with seating area, as well as a patio where students are able to connect to the internet using their portable devices.

The IB averaged 70 million dollars in order for its construction to commence. The Instructional Building was funded by both the federal and provincial governments. In doing its part, the federal government spent 35 million dollars in collaboration with the Knowledge Infrastructure Program. The provincial government has invested an additional 35 million in corresponding to the contribution from Queen's Park in its budget of 2009.

The Instructional centre was designed by Shore Tilbe Perkins+ Will, now known as Perkins+Will Canada. The design and the technological ideas involved in the production of the Instructional Building at the University of Toronto at the Mississauga campus won the Award of Excellence at the 30th annual Mississauga Urban Design Awards competition. The Instructional Building opened its doors in August 2011 and was presented with this award on November 22 in Mississauga City Hall.

Terrence Donnelly Health Sciences Complex

The Terrence Donnelly Health Sciences Complex is the University of Toronto Mississauga's newest educational building. The new building houses the Mississauga Academy of Medicine, the department of Biomedical Communications and the department of Anthropology and Forensics. The TDHSC building was designed by Kongats Architects Toronto. Funding for the new building was provided by Carlo Fidani, Terrence Donnelly, and the Provincial Government.  Carlo Fidani donated $10 million for building costs, scholarships, and a chair in family and community medicine. Terrence Donnelly donated $12 million to building costs and scholarships. Capital funding for the project of $30.3 million was provided by the Provincial Government. The construction for the 5,960 square meter (64,153 square feet), four-story building began the summer of 2009.  The building officially opened on November 1, 2011.

The “stacked box” design building is built on a slope on the outer campus Drive Ring. The building was originally planned to have a steel structural framing but because of rising steel prices the structural framing had to be switched to concrete for the final design development. The lower cost of concrete framing meant that the custom stainless steel “skin” could be developed within the University of Toronto's budget requirements. The building's exterior had two “skins,” the main “skin” is insulated and waterproof while the separate exterior steel panel “skin” reflected heat. Inside the building are state-of-the-art classrooms, seminar rooms, computer facilities, learning spaces and laboratories. There is also a student lounge and unique outdoor terrace for students to relax and socialize.  Kongats Architects Toronto's principal Alar Kongats said on an e-mail interview, “The TDHSC is designed to achieve a North American LEED Gold sustainability designation.”. The building has subsequently received a 2012 Governor General's Medal in Architecture. A jury comment described it as "A large institutional building (that) is articulated and humanised by skillful massing and the inventive treatment of the facade. A cladding system of shimmering metal fins animates the stacked box arrangement of volumes, and gives the building a distinctive set-piece quality amid its campus neighbours. Interiors are luminous and civilised with ample natural light, and the sliding stacked volumes create terraces for encounter and engagement. The quality of detailing is exceptional and the sophisticated use of materials lifts the building into a class of its own."

Situated in the TDHSC is The Mississauga Academy of Medicine. The Mississauga Academy of Medicine is a partnership between U of T Mississauga, U of T's Faculty of Medicine, Trillium Health Centre and Credit Valley Hospital. In August 2011, The Mississauga Academy of Medicine welcomed 54 students to its first year class and expects to have 216 students enrolled in the four-year program by 2014.

Deerfield Hall (DH) 

Deerfield Hall was opened in September 2014 and is 4 stories tall. The building, along with renovations to the Davis Building, cost $75 million, 70% of which was funded by the Government of Ontario. The building houses the offices and labs for the Department of Mathematical and Computational Sciences as well as the offices for the Department of Psychology.   The hall is LEED Silver certified.

Maanjiwe nendamowinan (MN) 

The Maanjiwe nendamowinan building, abbreviated MN, is the newest building at UTM, and was built in place of the demolished North building. The building was opened in September 2018 as the New North building. On August 22, 2019, the university announced that the building would be renamed to Maanjiwe nendamowinan after consulting with the Mississaugas of the Credit First Nation. The name means "gathering of minds" in the Anishinaabemowin language. Maanjiwe nendamowinan has a floor space of 20,500 square metres (220,600 sq ft) and is six stories tall. MN has a Leadership in Energy and Environmental Design (LEED) Silver certification for its sustainability features, including rainwater recycling, energy-efficient mechanical systems, a green roof, and bird-safe glass. In 2021 it won a Citation Award from the American Institute of Architects (AIA), Canada Society chapter. Also in 2021, the building received an Award of Merit from the City of Mississauga Urban Design Awards.

The building has two active learning classrooms and houses the Departments of English & Drama, Historical Studies, Language Studies, Philosophy, Political Science, and Sociology.

References

Mississauga Educational Buildings